Charles Milesi (born 4 March 2001) is a French racing driver. He is the son of Patrice Milesi who is also a racing driver.

Career

Early career
After success in karting, Milesi's driving career began in 2017 in Formula Renault. For two years, he competed in various series of this racing formula. In 2018, he reached seventh place in the Formula Renault Eurocup.

In 2019, at the end of the 8 Hours of Bahrain, a WEC rookie test was organized on the same circuit. Milesi thus had the opportunity to make his first laps in the hands of a prototype for the Dutch team Racing Team Nederland.

In 2020, following the withdrawal of Alexandre Cougnaud and a positive test at the end of the 2020 Castellet 240 with Graff Racing, Milesi had the opportunity to join this same team in order to participate in the 24 Hours of Le Mans in the hands of an Oreca 07 in the LMP2 category with Vincent Capillaire and James Allen as co-drivers. Unfortunately, in their first participation, Milesi could not see the checkered flag after going off the track in the last hour of the race when Allen was at the wheel. With this first experience in the hands of an LMP2 and following the withdrawal of the Mexican driver Memo Rojas, Milesi had the opportunity to join the American team DragonSpeed in order to participate in the 4 Hours of Monza. This race went in the best possible way because the car finished in 3rd position. Unfortunately, a problem with the height of the non-compliant diffuser, the car was disqualified at the end of the race. Milesi then finished his year by taking part in the final of the Michelin Le Mans Cup with the CD Sport team in the hands of a Ligier JS P320.

Milesi also competed in the Super Formula Championship in the back end of 2020, racing for Buzz Racing with B-MAX.

Endurance racing

2021
In 2021, Milesi started his season participating in the 24 Hours of Daytona with the Dutch team Racing Team Nederland in the hands of an Oreca 07 in the LMP2 category with Dutch drivers Giedo van der Garde,  and Job van Uitert as teammates. That year, the Frenchman's main campaign would lie in the FIA World Endurance Championship, where he partnered Robin Frijns and Ferdinand Habsburg at newcomers Team WRT. Having started the season slowly with tenth and fourth at Spa-Francorchamps and Portimão respectively, the team would bounce back with a maiden podium at the 6 Hours of Monza, where, despite being categorized as a silver driver amongst a slew of platinum and gold drivers, Milesi scored pole position in the LMP2 class. Encouraged by the result, the outfit performed strongly during the 24 Hours of Le Mans, leading into Sunday afternoon before encountering issues that meant that the sister WRT car looked to be on course to win the race. However, due to an car failure, the No. 41 WRT stopped on the final lap, meaning that Milesi, Frijns and Habsburg were able to take the lead and win the race, finishing less than a second ahead of the Nr. 28 Jota car. Another win followed at the 6 Hours of Bahrain, which put the team into the championship lead, before Milesi and his teammates were able to claim the LMP2 world ritle one week later at the 8 Hours of Bahrain.

Near the end of the year, Milesi also competed in two rounds of the European Le Mans Series with Cool Racing, where he scored back-to-back pole positions.

2022 
The following year, Milesi would remain in the WEC, moving to the Richard Mille Racing Team to drive alongside Lilou Wadoux and Sébastien Ogier. With those two drivers being rookies to the LMP2 car, the team struggled, ending up ninth in the teams' standings, having finished ninth at Le Mans.

2023 
Milesi remained with the outfit that had rebranded to the Alpine Elf Team for the 2023 season, this time being partnered by Julien Canal and Matthieu Vaxivière.

Racing record

Racing career summary

‡ Points only counted towards the Michelin Endurance Cup, and not the overall LMP2 Championship.
* Season still in progress.

Complete French F4 Championship results 
(key) (Races in bold indicate pole position) (Races in italics indicate fastest lap)

Complete Formula Renault Eurocup results
(key) (Races in bold indicate pole position) (Races in italics indicate fastest lap)

† As Milesi was a guest driver, he was ineligible for points.

Complete Toyota Racing Series results 
(key) (Races in bold indicate pole position) (Races in italics indicate fastest lap)

Complete Japanese Formula 3 Championship results 
(key) (Races in bold indicate pole position) (Races in italics indicate fastest lap)

Complete Super Formula results

Complete FIA World Endurance Championship results
(key) (Races in bold indicate pole position) (Races in italics indicate fastest lap)

* Season still in progress.

Complete 24 Hours of Le Mans results

Complete IMSA SportsCar Championship results
(key) (Races in bold indicate pole position; races in italics indicate fastest lap)

† Points only counted towards the Michelin Endurance Cup, and not the overall LMP2 Championship.

Complete European Le Mans Series results

References

External links
 

2001 births
Living people
Sportspeople from Haute-Marne
French racing drivers
Super Formula drivers
European Le Mans Series drivers
24 Hours of Daytona drivers
24 Hours of Le Mans drivers
Formula Renault Eurocup drivers
Formula Renault 2.0 NEC drivers
French F4 Championship drivers
Toyota Racing Series drivers
Japanese Formula 3 Championship drivers
FIA World Endurance Championship drivers
WeatherTech SportsCar Championship drivers
Carlin racing drivers
Graff Racing drivers
DragonSpeed drivers
W Racing Team drivers
Racing Team Nederland drivers
R-ace GP drivers
Karting World Championship drivers
Signature Team drivers
Motopark Academy drivers
Le Mans Cup drivers
B-Max Racing drivers